South Ossetia is subdivided into four raions/districts:

<div style="position: relative;">

Subdivisions of South Ossetia